Delta Academies Trust (formerly Schools Partnership Trust Academies) is a multi-academy trust, operating 46 schools. As an academy trust, it is an exempt charity regulated by the Department for Education.

Its current CEO is Paul Tarn.

A critical report from Ofsted in early 2016 prompted reforms at Schools Partnership Trust Academies. A new CEO—Paul Tarn, formerly deputy CEO of Outwood Grange Academies Trust (OGAT)—was appointed; he was joined by a Maths and English Director who transferred to Delta shortly after the CEO took up post. It went on to rebrand as "Delta Academies Trust" as of October 2016.

Schools

All through
 The Elland Academy, Leeds
 Serlby Park Academy, Doncaster
 St Wilfrid's Academy, Doncaster

Delta operated the former Dawes Lane Academy, a 3–19 free school in Scunthorpe, before its closure in 2015. The school had only opened a year previously, but encountered difficulties with pupil numbers and securing a permanent site.

Primary

 Craven Primary Academy, Kingston upon Hull
 Crookesbroom Primary Academy, Doncaster
 East Garforth Primary Academy, Leeds
 England Lane Academy, Wakefield
 Estcourt Primary Academy, Kingston upon Hull
 Grange Lane Infant Academy, Doncaster
 Green Lane Primary Academy, Leeds
 Goldthorpe Primary Academy, Barnsley
 Hatfield Woodhouse Primary School, Doncaster
 Highfields Primary Academy, Doncaster
 Kingston Park Academy, Worksop
 Macaulay Primary Academy, Grimsby
 Mersey Primary Academy, Kingston upon Hull
 Montagu Academy, Doncaster
 Morley Place Academy, Doncaster
 Park View Primary Academy, Leeds
 Pheasant Bank Academy, Doncaster
 Rowena Academy, Doncaster
 Simpson's Lane Academy, Wakefield
 Southmere Primary Academy, Bradford
 Strand Primary Academy, Grimsby
 The Parks Primary Academy, Kingston upon Hull
 The Vale Primary Academy, Wakefield
 Weelsby Academy, Grimsby
 Whetley Academy, Bradford
 Willoughby Road Primary Academy, Scunthorpe
 Willow Green Academy, Wakefield
 Willows Academy, Grimsby
 Worlaby Academy, Brigg
 Wybers Wood Academy, Grimsby

Secondary
 Ash Hill Academy, Doncaster
 Darton Academy, Darton
 De Lacy Academy, Wakefield
 De Warenne Academy, Doncaster
 Don Valley Academy, Doncaster
 Doncaster Collegiate Sixth Form, Doncaster
 Garforth Academy, Leeds
 Goole Academy, Goole
 Hanson Academy, Bradford
 Hull Trinity House Academy, Kingston upon Hull
 Ingleby Manor Free School, Maltby
 John Whitgift Academy, Grimsby
 Manor Croft Academy, Dewsbury
 Melior Community Academy, Scunthorpe
 Rossington All Saints Academy, Doncaster
 The Grove Academy, Harrogate
 The Vale Academy, Brigg

On 10 October 2017, the Department for Education announced that Delta was its preferred new sponsor for Mexborough Academy (Doncaster).

References

External links
 

Educational charities based in the United Kingdom
 
Educational institutions established in 2010
Academy trusts
2010 establishments in the United Kingdom